Pareques acuminatus, (the high-hat, cubbyu, streaked ribbonfish or striped drum), is a small fish, usually between 6 and 9 inches, that can occasionally be found on coral reefs in the middle western Atlantic Ocean, in the Caribbean, the Gulf of Mexico, Florida and the Bahamas. High-hats are typically black and white or dark brown and white.

Habitat 
Young high-hats typically live in rocks and coral hidden from predators. Generally they inhabit reef areas.

Diet 
High-hats are carnivorous fish that feed on crabs, shrimps and small invertebrates.

Behavior 
This species is not aggressive and can live well with other species of small fish

References

External links
 

Sciaenidae
Fish of the Atlantic Ocean
a
Fish described in 1801